The 1989 Island Games were the third Island Games, and were held in Faroe Islands, from July 5 to July 13, 1989.

Medal table

Sports
The sports chosen for the games were:

External links
 1989 Island Games

Island Games
Multi-sport events in the Faroe Islands
Island Games, 1989
1989 in Faroese sport
Sport in Tórshavn
International sports competitions hosted by the Faroe Islands
July 1989 sports events in Europe